Héroe a la fuerza ("Hero in the Force") is a 1964 Mexican film. It stars Eulalio González, Rosa de Castilla y Sara García. It also features Óscar Pulido, David Reynoso, Arturo Castro, Nathanael León, Alejandro Reyna, Ramón Valdés and Víctor Alcocer.

Cast
Eulalio González as Caín / Abel
Rosa de Castilla as Lucha
Sara García as Doña Prudencia
Óscar Pulido as Physician
Lola Casanova as Juana
David Reynoso
Arturo Castro as Sheriff
José Luis Fernández
Nathanael León
José Chávez
Alejandro Reyna as Bartender
Ramón Valdés as Caín and Abel's father
Armando Gutiérrez as Physician
Roberto Meyer as Physician
Víctor Alcocer as School director
Emilio Garibay
Enrique García Álvarez
Carlos León
José Pardavé
René Barrera
Manuel Alvarado
Jesús Gómez
Vicente Lara
Leonor Gómez

External links
 

1964 films
Mexican comedy films
1960s Spanish-language films
Films directed by Miguel M. Delgado
1960s Mexican films